Robert Stevenson (1898 – after 1922) was a Scottish professional footballer who played as a full-back.

References

1898 births
Sportspeople from Wishaw
Scottish footballers
Association football fullbacks
Motherwell YMCA F.C. players
Grimsby Town F.C. players
English Football League players
Year of death missing
Footballers from North Lanarkshire